Teddy Williams (born 18 October 2000) is a Welsh rugby union player, currently playing for Pro14 side Cardiff Rugby. His preferred position is lock or flanker.

Club career
Williams signed his first professional contract for Cardiff in September 2020. He made his Cardiff debut in Round 6 of the 2020–21 Pro14 against Benetton.

In an interview on the Cardiff Rugby Instagram page in 2022 he revealed that his parents had named him after popular 80s animatronic bear Teddy Ruxpin.

International career 
Williams has represented Wales as a U18 and U20 international.

Williams was called into the Wales national rugby union team squad for the first time in January 2023.

Personal life 
Williams is the son of Welsh international Owain Williams, and nephew of Gareth Williams.

References

External links

2000 births
Living people
Cardiff Rugby players
Rugby union flankers
Rugby union locks
Rugby union players from Cardiff
Welsh rugby union players